Trioceros affinis, Rüppell's desert chameleon or beardless Ethiopian montane chameleon, is a species of chameleon endemic to Ethiopia.

References

Trioceros
Reptiles of Ethiopia
Endemic fauna of Ethiopia
Reptiles described in 1845
Taxa named by Eduard Rüppell